The 2013–14 season was the 110th season in Real Madrid's history and their 83rd consecutive season in La Liga, the top division of Spanish football. It covered a period from 1 July 2013 to 30 June 2014, and ended with the club clinching a unique European cup double.

The team competed for a record 33rd La Liga title and entered the UEFA Champions League for the 17th successive season, competing for a record 10th title. They also entered the Copa del Rey in the round of 32. Real Madrid's shirt sponsor for this season was Emirates, having replaced Bwin.com. The club's major signing of the summer window was the long-awaited transfer of Gareth Bale from Tottenham Hotspur for €100 million.

In new manager Carlo Ancelotti's first season at the club, Real Madrid fought on all three fronts for the continental treble. Despite leading in the league standings on multiple occasions, Madrid ultimately finished in third place (level on points with Barcelona and three behind cross-city rivals Atlético Madrid), collecting 87 points in total and scoring a record 104 goals. By that time, Los Blancos had already secured the Copa del Rey – against rivals Barcelona – in April, with Bale scoring the winner. The major breakthrough came in the UEFA Champions League, where Real returned to the final after 12 years, having beaten defending champions Bayern Munich 5–0 on aggregate in the semi-finals. In the final, they defeated then-recently-league winners Atlético Madrid 4–1 a.e.t. to clinch their tenth European Cup (first since 2002) and become the first team to win ten European Cups/Champions League titles, an achievement known as "La Décima". Real's attacking trio of Bale, Benzema and Cristiano, dubbed the BBC, finished the season with 97 goals.

This season was the first since 2005–06 without Argentinian striker Gonzalo Higuaín, who left to join Napoli, and the first since 2009–10 without fellow German midfielder Mesut Özil who departed for Arsenal F.C.

Season overview

Pre-season
Real Madrid started the summer without a manager, as José Mourinho departed to manage Chelsea. On 25 June, Carlo Ancelotti was officially announced as Real Madrid's new manager for the next three seasons. He appeared for his first press conference in front of the media on 26 June.

On 3 June, Real Madrid announced its first signing of the season by exercising the buyback option for Dani Carvajal from Bayer Leverkusen for €6.5 million.

On 10 June, Real Madrid announced the signing of former youth system loanee Casemiro from São Paulo for €6 million.

On 27 June, Real Madrid announced its first major signing of the season with Isco from Málaga for €30 million.

On 10 July, Real Madrid agreed a contract extension with defender Nacho, keeping him in the club for four more years.

On 11 July, Real Madrid announced the sale of José Callejón to Napoli for €10 million.

On 12 July, Asier Illarramendi from Real Sociedad became the fourth signing for Real Madrid for €32.2 million, penning a six-year deal. He was the fifth player in the first team that won the 2013 UEFA European Under-21 Championship last June with Spain.

On 21 July, Real Madrid began its pre-season campaign against English Second Division side AFC Bournemouth. This was Carlo Ancelotti's first game in charge, with Madrid winning 6–0. Cristiano Ronaldo scored a brace and Sami Khedira, Gonzalo Higuaín, Casemiro and Ángel Di María chipped in the other goals. Real Madrid also announced the sale of Raúl Albiol to Napoli for €11 million.

On 24 July, Real Madrid played its second pre-season match against Lyon, coming from two goals down to draw 2–2 with goals from Casemiro and Álvaro Morata. Madrid also agreed on a contract extension with Jesé which would keep him with at the club for four additional years.

On 25 July, Real Madrid agreed a contract extension with Denis Cheryshev, keeping him with the club for four more years.

On 27 July, Real Madrid faced Paris Saint-Germain, Ancelotti's former club, winning 1–0, with Karim Benzema scoring the lone goal. Also, Real Madrid announced the sale of Gonzalo Higuaín to Napoli for €40 million.

On 1 August, Real Madrid played its first match in the International Champions Cup (ICC) against the LA Galaxy, recording a 3–1 victory with a goal from Ángel Di María and two from Karim Benzema.

On 3 August, Real Madrid faced Everton in the ICC semi-finals, beating them 2–1, with Cristiano Ronaldo and Mesut Özil scoring the goals.

On 7 August, Real Madrid faced Chelsea in the ICC final, led by former manager José Mourinho. Madrid recorded a 3–1 victory, with a brace by Cristiano Ronaldo and a goal from Marcelo capping a balanced team effort for Los Blancos.

On 10 August, Real Madrid played its final pre-season match against Italian squad Inter. Los Merengues got goals from Kaká and Ronaldo and also a Ricky Álvarez own goal in a 3–0 victory.

On 1 September, Madrid reached an agreement for the transfer of Gareth Bale from Tottenham Hotspur for a world record transfer fee of £85.3 million (€100 million).

Concluding the summer transfer window, Real Madrid had signed five players, as well as promoting three more from the youth system. Madrid had spent €165.5 million in the window and generated €108.5 million from sales, resulting in a net loss of €57 million.

August
Real Madrid officially kicked off its La Liga campaign on 18 August, playing home to Real Betis. Ancelotti fielded a 4–3–3 formation, while playing a style of attacking football, like that of José Mourinho's tactics. Real Madrid went on to win the match 2–1, with goals from Karim Benzema and debutante Isco, ensuring Ancelotti got off to a winning start.

Madrid's second match of the season – and final match of August – was a 0–1 away win at Granada, where a goal from Benzema ensured the victory for the club.

September
Madrid's third match of the campaign was a 3–1 home win against Athletic Bilbao, with a brace from Isco and a goal from Cristiano Ronaldo sealing the deal for Los Blancos.

Madrid was unable to progress up the table, recording a 2–2 away draw against Villarreal. Although there were goals from both of Madrid's world record signings, Gareth Bale and Cristiano Ronaldo, two goals from Cani and Giovani dos Santos held Real to a draw.

Madrid's third match of September was the club's opening Champions League away clash with Turkish side Galatasaray. The match turned out to be a goal fest, with Madrid producing six out of the seven goals scored. A hat-trick from Cristiano Ronaldo, two from Benzema and one from Isco ensured the Madrid side a 1–6 victory.

In Real's fourth match of September, their fourth match of the Liga campaign, Madrid recorded a 4–1 home win against Getafe, following a brace from Ronaldo, a goal from Pepe and a goal from Isco ensured the Madrid side the victory.

Los Blancos then travelled away to Elche, coming home with a 1–2 win with two goals from Ronaldo.

Madrid then faced rivals Atlético Madrid in El Derbi madrileño. A Diego Costa goal in the 11th minute was all that was needed for Atlético, securing a 0–1 win against their rivals.

October
Real Madrid opened October with their second Champions League clash, this time against Danish side Copenhagen at the Santiago Bernabéu. Braces from both Ronaldo and Di María produced the goals for Madrid, who won 4–0.

Madrid travelled to Levante, recording a 2–3 away win, with goals from Sergio Ramos, Álvaro Morata and Ronaldo, coming back from 2–1 down. Real Madrid then hosted Málaga in a 2–0 home win, with goals from Di María and Ronaldo.

Los Blancos then began their third Champions League group clash, this time against Italian side Juventus. Ronaldo opened the scoring, netting in the fourth minute, while Fernando Llorente equalized a mere ten minutes later for Juve, leveling the score at 1–1. A penalty was awarded to Madrid in the 29th minute, which was successfully converted by Ronaldo. The game ended at 2–1 to Madrid.

Real Madrid then travelled away to Barcelona to contest El Clásico. Goals from Neymar and Alexis Sánchez gave the Catalan side the lead, but a stoppage time goal from Jesé after a brilliant solo run by Ronaldo resulted in Barça only holding a one-goal deficit against Madrid.

Real Madrid then hosted Sevilla, a match which proved to be a ten-goal thriller. A hat-trick from Ronaldo, along with a brace from Bale and Benzema, ensured Los Blancos a deserved 7–3 win.

November
Real Madrid opened November with a tight 2–3 away win against Rayo Vallecano. Two goals from Ronaldo, along with one from Benzema, gave Madridistas the win.

Madrid faced Juventus in another Champions League group match, this time away. The game ended 2–2, with goals from Ronaldo and Bale, while Arturo Vidal and Fernando Llorente scored for the Italian side.

Real then faced Real Sociedad at the Santiago Bernabéu, with Madrid almost finishing the match in the first half, putting away four goals. The goals before the break included a brace from Ronaldo, one from Benzema and one from Sami Khedira. Ronaldo completed the hat-trick in the second half, with the game ending 5–1 to Real.

Real faced Galatasary again in another Champions League group clash, this time at home, with Madrid winning 4–1. Sergio Ramos got dismissed near to the half-time break, but a consistent Madrid side held on with goals from Bale, Di María, Isco and Álvaro Arbeloa giving the Spanish giants the victory, along with ensuring the Madrid side a place in the knockout phase of the Champions League.

On the 27th, defensive midfielder Sami Khedira suffered a season-long injury playing in an international match for Germany against Italy. The injury was described as a "huge shock" from teammate Xabi Alonso.

November turned out to be a month in which Madrid went undefeated in all competitions, as Real closed November with a 4–0 home win against Real Valladolid, with a hat-trick from Bale and a goal from Benzema ensuring the Madrid side the win.

December
Real Madrid began December against Olímpic de Xàtiva in the Copa del Rey round of 32, with the game ending 0–0.

Madrid then faced Copenhagen away for their sixth Champions League group match, with the game ending 0–2 to Real. Goals from Luka Modrić and Ronaldo ensured Madrid the win. Ronaldo's goal set the new record for most goals scored in the Champions League group stages, with nine. The match was Madrid's final of the group stage, and they were the only team in their group to progress to the knockout round undefeated.

Los Blancos then faced Osasuna away on the 14th. Madrid were down 2–0 in the first 40 minutes and were reduced to ten men (Sergio Ramos was dismissed at the stroke of half time), but were able to come away with a draw as Isco and Pepe scored to salvage a point.

In a midweek clash, Real faced Olímpic de Xàtiva in the second leg of the Copa del Rey, this time winning 2–0 at home and progressing further in the competition. A goal from Asier Illarramendi along with a penalty from Di María gave Madrid the goals, and the side was able to progress into the round of 16.

Madrid then faced Valencia away in La Liga, with Real winning 2–3. Goals from Ronaldo, Di María and Jesé gave the Madrid side the three points to climb up the La Liga table, along with going through the final two months of 2013 undefeated.

January
Madrid officially kicked off 2014 in a La Liga home match against Celta de Vigo. Madrid had failed to score in the first half, but a Benzema goal in the 67th minute broke the deadlock. Real, however, were not finished, as two goals from Ronaldo, one in the 82nd and another in stoppage time of the second half, gave the Madrid side another three points.

Real's second match was against Osasuna in the Copa del Rey round of 16, with the first leg being played at the Santiago Bernabéu. A 17th-minute goal from Benzema, along with a 60th-minute strike from youth star Jesé gave the Madrid side a 2–0 aggregate advantage heading into the second leg.

Madrid's third game of January came in La Liga, with Real visiting Espanyol away. A goal from centre-back Pepe was all that was required for Madrid to collect three points in a 0–1 win.

Madrid then had to focus themselves on their second leg Copa del Rey round of 16 clash away at Osasuna. Madrid again won this game 0–2, with goals from Ronaldo and Di María, who scored in the 21st and 56th minutes respectively. This win meant Real had progressed into the quarter-finals of the Copa del Rey.

Real Madrid then faced Real Betis away, with the match ending in a resounding 0–5 victory to Los Blancos. Ronaldo scored a powerful long shot and assisted Morata with a bicycle kick, while the other goals were scored by Bale, Benzema, and Di María, helping collect another three points. This win propelled Madrid to joint top of La Liga.

Madrid faced Espanyol in the quarter-finals of the Copa del Rey, earning a 0–1 away result with a Benzema goal.

Real then faced 17th-placed Granada in a routine 2–0 home win. The goals came from Ronaldo and Benzema in the 56th and 74th minute respectively. The win propelled the Madrid side to the top of La Liga.

Madrid's final match of January came as a 1–0 home win against Espanyol in the quarter-finals of the Copa del Rey. Youth project Jesé scored early on, and Madrid were able to hang on tight until the end, winning 2–0 on aggregate and progressing to the semi-finals.

February
Madrid kicked off February with a disappointing 1–1 draw against fourth-placed Athletic Bilbao, with Jesé scoring the lone goal for Real. They finished on an even sourer note, as Ronaldo was sent off in the 75th minute.

Madrid were drawn to face fierce rivals Atlético Madrid in the semi-finals of the Copa del Rey. Real were without the suspended Ronaldo, but their star Portuguese forward was not required, as they won at home 3–0. Goals came from centre-back Pepe, winger Jesé and Argentinian forward Ángel Di María.

Real Madrid then faced Villarreal in La Liga, winning 4–2 at home. Goals from Bale, a brace from Benzema along with another strike from Jesé gave Madrid the win, but Mario and Giovani dos Santos goals for Villarreal denied Los Blancos a clean sheet. This was Ronaldo's final match suspended, meaning he would be available in the second leg of the Copa del Rey clash against Atlético.

Real's fourth match of February was their away leg clash against Atlético in the Copa del Rey. Returning star Ronaldo gave Real Madrid the win, with two converted penalties. These two goals meant Ronaldo had netted an impressive 34 goals in all competitions. Madrid's victory ensured they would face Barcelona in El Clásico for the Copa del Rey final at the Mestalla Stadium.

Real Madrid then faced Getafe in La Liga, away at the Coliseum Alfonso Pérez. Madrid comfortably cruised through the match, winning 0–3 with a goal from Jesé, who had scored in his last three La Liga matches, along with goals from Benzema and Modrić, and the win placed the Madrid side in second, on level points with Barcelona and Atlético Madrid.

The next match for Real Madrid proved to be vital, as winning would allow them to top La Liga, something the Spanish giants have not done for 15 months, but would only occur if Barcelona and Atlético Madrid lose. They faced Elche at home, winning 3–0 with a golazo from Gareth Bale, who struck from thirty yards out, along with goals from Illaramendi and Isco. Madrid's victory, along with Barcelona losing 3–1 to Real Sociedad and Atlético losing 3–0 to Osasuna, allowed them to top La Liga by three points.

Madrid's last match of February was the first leg of their last 16 Champions League clash against Schalke 04 away. The match turned out to be a seven-goal thriller for Madrid, as they won 1–6, effectively killing off the second leg and virtually guaranteeing Madrid a spot in the last eight of the competition. Braces were all scored by the returning Ronaldo, winger Bale and striker Benzema. However, a volley from Klaas-Jan Huntelaar in the 90th minute denied Madrid a clean sheet, along with ending captain and goalkeeper Iker Casillas' record of going over 900 minutes without conceding.

March
Real had a chance to extend their lead at the top of the table, should they win in El Derbi madrileño in La Liga against Atlético Madrid. Benzema scored early on to give Real the lead, before Koke equalised, slotting into the bottom left corner. Koke also assisted the second of Atlético's goal, which was scored by Gabi, who found the top left corner. Looking like a win for Real's bitter rivals, Cristiano Ronaldo scored and equalised and the game ended 2–2. Real gained a point and maintained the status quo at the top of La Liga, but now only carried a one-point lead over Barcelona.

Real's second match of March was also their second La Liga match of March, as the leaders took on Levante. Ronaldo jumped highest to powerfully head in Di María's left-wing corner and Marcelo doubled their lead shortly after the restart. Levante were reduced to ten men after David Navarro fought with an opponent. Real tripled their lead after Nikolaos Karabelas slid the ball in his own net. The win pushed Real three points clear at the top of La Liga, along with being four points above rivals Barcelona.

Madrid had a chance to propel their lead over Barcelona, who had dominated the league in the previous seasons, should they beat Málaga. Barça suffered a shock defeat at the hands of Real Valladolid, and should Real win, the Madrid side would be seven points clear at the top over their fierce rivals. A strike from Ronaldo gave Madrid an early advantage, but many shots went amiss and the game finished in a close 0–1 victory to the Madrid side.

Madrid subsequently hosted Schalke 04 for the second leg of their Champions League last 16 clash, with Madrid already boasting a 6–1 aggregate lead. A strike from Ronaldo just after the 20th minute gave Real the lead only for Tim Hoogland to equalize, and the teams went into half time at 1–1. Madrid continued to pile on the pressure and were ultimately rewarded after Ronaldo found the net again in the 74th minute. Morata scored another to end the game at 3–1. Winning at a combined score of 9–2 on both legs, Madrid progressed to the next round of the tournament.

Madrid then hosted fierce rivals Barcelona, who were beginning to hit form and pile on the pressure to Los Blancos. In what could be called as one of the most entertaining Clásicos of all time, a seven-goal thriller was played. Andrés Iniesta gave Barça the lead in the seventh minute, before two strikes from Karim Benzema in quick succession reversed the fortunes. Lionel Messi scored an equaliser, but Ronaldo gave Madrid the advantage netting home a penalty. Messi equalised again after a challenge from Madrid's defender Sergio Ramos resulted in a penalty and Ramos being sent off in the 63rd minute, along with converting another penalty, which completed the hat-trick for the Argentinian, along with him breaking the record for the number of goals scored in El Clásico. The game was also notorious for dodgy officiating and missed chances, and it was named one of the most controversial matches ever.

Madrid then travelled to Sevilla, hoping to move up the La Liga table and keep pressure on their title rivals. Madrid found the net early, thanks to Ronaldo, before Carlos Bacca netted in just under 20 minutes. Bacca scored again in the 72nd minute, giving Sevilla the win and putting a dent in Madrid's title challenge.

Madrid's final match of March was at home to Rayo Vallecano, a game which Madrid dominated, scoring five in the process. Ronaldo netted early, before right-back Dani Carvajal scored in the second half, after which Bale added a brace, along with a strike from Morata, giving Madrid the three points and reclaiming back the winning momentum after suffering back-to-back defeats.

April
Real Madrid began April by hosting Borussia Dortmund in the first leg of the Champions League quarter-finals at the Santiago Bernabéu, three days after the thrashing of Vallecano. Having decimated Schalke 04 in the round of 16, Madrid hosted last year's Champions League finalists. Furthermore, Dortmund had defeated Real 4–3 on aggregate in last season's semi-finals, and Los Blancos were eager to get their revenge. Bale opened the scoring in the third minute, before Isco added another, with Madrid leading 2–0 at half time. Ronaldo added another before Madrid played calm to win comprehensively. The 3–0 Madrid victory required Dortmund to score four goals in the next round to progress further in the competition.

Madrid's second match of April was against Real Sociedad. Goals from Illarramendi, Bale, Pepe and Morata helped Real to a calm 4–0 victory.

Madrid travelled away to Dortmund for the second leg of the Champions League quarter-finals, and lost 2–0 after an impressive solo performance from Marco Reus. His efforts fell to fruition, however, as Madrid progressed into the semi-finals of the competition, where they would face last year's winners in Bayern Munich.

Madrid's fourth match of April was against Almería, and the match was the second in a row where Madrid scored four goals, as another 4–0 win kept them in the race for the title, thanks to goals from Di María, Bale, Isco and Morata.

Madrid's fifth match of April was against fierce rivals Barcelona in the final of the Copa del Rey. Superstar Ronaldo was injured and unavailable for the game, but Madrid boasted a proud record, as they were the only side in the competition not to concede, and found the net early thanks to Di María. Heading into the late stages of the match, Marc Bartra scored for Barça, levelling the scores. As it looked like the match would be contested in extra time, a brilliant solo goal from Bale late on ensured Madrid the trophy, lifting their 19th Copa del Rey title.

The next fixture was a crucial one for Los Blancos as they faced the defending champions of the European Cup and perennial rivals Bayern Munich in the Champions League semi-finals. Real won thanks to a Benzema goal in a tightly contested game.

In between two crucial battles against Bayern, Madrid easily dispatched of Osasuna 4–0 in the league thanks to a brace from Ronaldo, which consisted of two marvelous long shots, plus goals by Ramos and Carvajal. This was Real's third consecutive league victory with at least four goals scored and none conceded.

In what very few genuinely expected, Madridistas not only capped their successful month by progressing to the Champions League final for the first time in 12 years, they utterly humiliated the defending champions at their own backyard. The Whites dominated the entire game and scored four unanswered goals (Ramos and Ronaldo doubles), winning the semi-final matchup 5–0 on aggregate. Victory over Bayern meant that Madrid had defeated both finalists of the previous Champions League season en route to the final.

May
In terms of league performance, May was somewhat a disappointment for Real as the team won only one out of four games and failed to clinch the title, finishing three points behind rivals Atlético Madrid and level on points with Barcelona but below on head-to-head tiebreaking criteria. As a result, Madridistas finished the season third, but in title contention throughout the season. Besides, Madrid scored the most goals (104) out of all teams in their league campaign and was second only to Barça on goal differential (+66 to +67).

The league fixtures of the month were a 2–2 home tie with Valencia (with a 90+2 backheel equalizer from Ronaldo), a 1–1 away tie with Valladolid (with the home team equalizing late in the match), a 0–2 away defeat to Celta (that ruined Real's hopes for the title), and a 3–1 win over Espanyol on the last matchday.

Winning a long-awaited La Décima would be much more than a perfect consolation for Madridistas and they ultimately brought a record-extending tenth European Cup title from Lisbon, although their path was anything but easy. Diego Godín opened the scoring for Atlético in the first half and the Madrid team was on the run to accomplishing their first continental double in history up to the injury time of the second half when Sergio Ramos scored an all-important head ball equalizer after a corner kick. In the extra time, it was Real, Real, and only Real as Los Blancos obliterated the distraught rivals by scoring three unanswered goals in its second half (courtesy of Bale, Marcelo, and Ronaldo) and triumphed in the competition. Overall, Ronaldo scored 51 goals (31 in La Liga, a record 17 in the Champions League, and three in the Copa del Rey) to become the team's top scorer for the fifth consecutive season. The Portuguese would go even further in the next season, scoring 61 goals in all competitions and breaking his own record from 2011–12.

Kits
Supplier: Adidas / Sponsor: Fly Emirates

Players

Squad information

In

Total expenditure: €174.7 million

Out

Total revenue: €122.4M
Net income:  €52.3 million

Pre-season and friendlies

Last updated: 2 January 2014
Sources: Bournemouth, PSG, International Champions Cup, Bernabéu Trophy, Teresa Herrera Trophy, PSG

Competitions

La Liga

League table

Results by round

Matches

Last updated: 17 May 2014Source: RealMadrid.com, LFP.es, LigaBBVA.com, RFEF.es

Copa del Rey

Round of 32

Round of 16

Quarter-finals

Semi-finals

Final

Last updated: 16 April 2014
Source: Real Madrid

UEFA Champions League

Group stage

Knockout phase

Round of 16

Quarter-finals

Semi-finals

Final

Source: UEFA
Last updated: 24 May 2014

Statistics

Squad statistics

Goals

Last updated: 24 May 2014
Source: Match reports in Competitive matches

Disciplinary record

Overall
{| class="wikitable" style="text-align: center"
|-
!
!Total
!Home
!Away
|-
|align=left| Games played          || 60 || 29 || 30
|-
|align=left| Games won             || 46 || 26 || 19
|-
|align=left| Games drawn           || 8 || 1 || 7
|-
|align=left| Games lost            || 6 || 2 || 4
|-
|align=left| Biggest win           || 6–1 vs Galatasaray5–0 vs Almería5–0 vs Real Betis6–1 vs Schalke 045–0 vs Rayo Vallecano || 5–0 vs Rayo Vallecano || 6–1 vs Galatasaray5–0 vs Almería5–0 vs Real Betis6–1 vs Schalke 04
|-
|align=left| Biggest loss          || 0–2 vs Celta Vigo || 0–1 vs Atlético Madrid3–4 vs Barcelona || 0–2 vs Celta Vigo
|-
|align=left| Biggest win (League)  || 5–0 vs Almería5–0 vs Real Betis5–0 vs Rayo Vallecano || 5–0 vs Rayo Vallecano || 5–0 vs Almería5–0 vs Real Betis
|-
|align=left| Biggest win (Cup)     || 3–0 vs Atlético Madrid || 3–0 vs Atlético Madrid || 2–0 vs Osasuna
|-
|align=left| Biggest win (Europe)  || 6–1 vs Galatasaray6–1 vs Schalke 04 || 4–0 vs Copenhagen || 6–1 vs Galatasaray6–1 vs Schalke 04
|-
|align=left| Biggest loss (League) || 0–2 vs Celta Vigo || 0–1 vs Atlético Madrid3–4 vs Barcelona || 0–2 vs Celta Vigo
|-
|align=left| Biggest loss (Cup)    || colspan=3|—
|-
|align=left| Biggest loss (Europe) || 0–2 vs Borussia Dortmund || — || 0–2 vs Borussia Dortmund
|-
|align=left| Clean sheets          || 29 || 16 || 13
|-
|align=left| Goals scored          || 160 || 88 || 68
|-
|align=left| Goals conceded        || 49 || 19 || 28
|-
|align=left| Goal difference       || +111 || +68 || +40 
|-
|-
|-
|align=left| Yellow cards         || 115 || 43 || 67
|-
|align=left| Red cards            || 4 || 2 || 2
|-
|align=left| More game entries     || align=left| Isco (53) || colspan=2|—
|-
|align=left| Most minutes played  || align=left| Sergio Ramos (4558)|| colspan=2|—
|-
|align=left| Most goals           || align=left| Cristiano Ronaldo (51) || colspan=2|—
|-
|align=left| Points               || 148/180 (%) || 79/87 (%) || 64/90 (%)
|-
|align=left| Winning rate         || % || % || %

See also
 2013–14 Copa del Rey
 2013–14 La Liga
 2013–14 UEFA Champions League

References

External links

 Real Madrid at ESPN
 Real Madrid at Goal.com
 Real Madrid at Marca 
 Real Madrid at AS 
 Real Madrid at LFP 

Real Madrid CF seasons
Real Madrid
Real Madrid
UEFA Champions League-winning seasons